The penile raphe is a visible line or ridge of tissue that runs on the ventral side of the human penis beginning from the base of the shaft and ending in the prepuce. The line is typically darker than the rest of the shaft skin, even though its shape and pigmentation may vary among males. The penile raphe is part of a broader line in the male reproductive organs, that runs from the anus through the perineum (perineal raphe) and continues to the scrotum and penis, collectively referred to as median raphe.

The line consists of a subcutaneous fibrous plate, which may vary in prominence and thickness in various areas of the genitals. In the scrotum, the line is located over the internal scrotal septum that divides the two sides of the sac and is densely occupied by nerve fibers. The raphe may become more prominent and darker when the scrotal sac tightens due to contractions. Behind the scrotum it continues as the perineal raphe. The raphe results as a manifestation of the fusion of the labioscrotal, urogenital and preputial folds during the embryonic development of the male fetus.

See also 

 Raphe
 Perineal raphe

References 

Human male reproductive system
Human penis
Human penis anatomy